"Twenty Years Ago" is a song written by Dan Tyler, Wood Newton, Michael Noble and C. Michael Spriggs. It was recorded by Juice Newton for her 1983 album Dirty Looks. In 1986, the song was covered by Kenny Rogers and released in January 1987 as the second single from his album They Don't Make Them Like They Used To. Backup vocals were provided by Bill Champlin. It reached number two on the Billboard Hot Country Singles chart.

Content
In the song, the narrator talks about visiting the old town where he grew up in and mentions how much simpler and possibly better life was back then. He mentions the old movie house and the drug store where he worked and his childhood friend who died in Vietnam.  The music video was shot in Clarksville, Tennessee largely on Franklin Street.

Charts

Weekly charts

Year-end charts

References

1987 singles
Juice Newton songs
Kenny Rogers songs
Songs written by Wood Newton
RCA Records singles
1983 songs
Songs written by Dan Tyler